Megan Shull (born 1968) is an American author of books for children and young adults. Some of her best known works are, 'The Swap' (HarperCollins, 2014)—adapted as a Disney Channel Original Movie, 'Bounce' (HarperCollins, 2016) and the award-winning young adult novel 'Amazing Grace.' (Disney Hyperion, 2005).

Biography

Born and raised in Ithaca, New York, Shull holds a B.S. and a Ph.D. from Cornell University. At Cornell, Shull's doctoral work in educational psychology looked at ways to help young people retain their resilience as they navigate adolescence, and gave her inspiration as a writer.

A graduate of Ithaca High School, Shull competed in youth ice hockey before going on to play for Cornell University. While in graduate school, Shull founded a mentoring program with the women's hockey team. In 2000, she was a team rider for Girls on the Move, a special project of Outward Bound, USA, bicycling coast-to-coast from Portland, Oregon, to New York City.

Shull was given her big break in children's publishing by Pleasant Rowland, founder of American Girl. Shull's first two books – 'Yours Truly Skye O'Shea' and 'Skye's the Limit!' – were published by American Girl.

Today, Shull lives in her hometown, Ithaca.

References

External links 
 

1968 births
Living people
Cornell Big Red women's ice hockey players
Writers from Ithaca, New York
Cornell University alumni
American women novelists
American writers of young adult literature
Women writers of young adult literature
Novelists from New York (state)
21st-century American novelists
21st-century American women writers
Ithaca High School (Ithaca, New York) alumni